Azul River is a river of Acre state in western Brazil. It is a tributary of the Môa River.

The Azul River defines the eastern boundary of the northern section of the Serra do Divisor National Park

See also
List of rivers of Acre

References

Rivers of Acre (state)